Rocky Glen State Park is an undeveloped public recreation area covering  along the west side of the Pootatuck River in the town of Newtown,  Connecticut. The state park offers opportunities for hiking to a scenic cascade and includes a one-and-a-half mile stretch of Al's Trail, a  greenway trail that winds through Newtown. It appeared as the state's forty-seventh state park in the 1943 edition of the Connecticut Register and Manual. The park is managed by the Connecticut Department of Energy and Environmental Protection.

References

External links
Rocky Glen State Park Connecticut Department of Energy and Environmental Protection

State parks of Connecticut
Parks in Fairfield County, Connecticut
Protected areas established in 1943
Newtown, Connecticut